Haryau is a village that is situated in the Sangrur District of Punjab, India. This Village established in 1650 by Multania Sangu. Mughal empire Shahjahan gave 78,000 Vigha land to Multania Sangu, where Multania Sangu establish this Village. This village is also known by Haryau-Sangva.
It has one government school, three private schools, one government hospital, one co-operative agriculture society and Bank, one HDFC bank, two main gurudwara's, one mosque and one suvidha kendra.

Gallery

Villages in Sangrur district